Ana Radović (born 23 January 1997) is Bosnian female basketball player.

External links
Profile at eurobasket.com

1997 births
Living people
Bosnia and Herzegovina women's basketball players
Small forwards